Robert Steven Ferrell (born November 13, 1952 in Los Angeles, California) is a former professional American football running back who played for five seasons for the San Francisco 49ers of the National Football League.

References

1952 births
Living people
Players of American football from Los Angeles
American football running backs
UCLA Bruins football players
San Francisco 49ers players
Southern California Sun players